Reinicke is a surname. Notable people with the surname include:

Andreas Reinicke, German diplomat and currently the German Ambassador to Tunisia
Hansjürgen Reinicke (1902–1978), Captain at sea, commander of heavy cruiser Prinz Eugen, in Nazi Germany's Kriegsmarine during the Second World War
René Reinicke (1860–1926), German painter and illustrator
Wulf Reinicke, East German retired slalom canoeist